Eois olivacea is a moth in the family Geometridae. It is found in Colombia, Ecuador and Venezuela.

References

Moths described in 1875
Eois
Moths of South America